The Maritime & Yachting Museum is located at 3250 Southwest Kanner Highway, Stuart, Florida, USA.  The museum houses many maritime items and artwork, including model ships, antique boats, navigation equipment, paintings and photographs.

See also
List of maritime museums in the United States

References

External links

Maritime museums in Florida
Museums in Martin County, Florida
Museums established in 1995
1995 establishments in Florida